Harry Clay Westover (May 19, 1894 – April 14, 1983) was a United States district judge of the United States District Court for the Southern District of California.

Education and career
Born in Williamstown, Kentucky, Westover received a Bachelor of Laws from the James E. Rogers College of Law at the University of Arizona in 1918. After graduating from college, he became a 2nd lieutenant in the Central Machine Guns Corps of the United States Army and was stationed at Camp Hancock, Georgia until January 1919. He later became a member of the California State Senate, and Collector of Internal Revenue for the sixth district of California.

Federal judicial service
On September 23, 1949, Westover was nominated by President Harry S. Truman to a new seat on the United States District Court for the Southern District of California created by 63 Stat. 493. He was confirmed by the United States Senate on October 15, 1949, and received his commission on October 18, 1949. He assumed senior status on December 31, 1965, serving in that capacity until his death on April 14, 1983, in Laguna Hills, California.

References

Sources

External links
Join California Harry C. Westover

1894 births
1983 deaths
20th-century American judges
20th-century American politicians
Democratic Party California state senators
James E. Rogers College of Law alumni
Judges of the United States District Court for the Southern District of California
People from Williamstown, Kentucky
United States Army officers
United States district court judges appointed by Harry S. Truman